Uzel may refer to:
 Uzel, a village and commune in the Côtes-d'Armor département, France
 Uzel (computer), the first digital computer used on Soviet submarines
 Uzel Holding, a former agricultural machinery manufacturer in Turkey

People 
 Ahmet Uzel (1930-1998), a Turkish composer

Jindřich Uzel (1868-1946), Czech entomologist
Radim Uzel (1940-present), a Czech sexologist